Thomas Salusbury may refer to:

Sir Thomas Salisbury (c. 1564–1586),  Thomas Salusbury, one of the conspirators executed for his involvement in the Babington Plot
Sir Thomas Salusbury, 2nd Baronet (1612–1643), a.k.a. Sir Thomas Salisbury, a  Welsh poet, politician and Royalist colonel during the Civil War
Thomas Salusbury (Liverpool MP) (died 1756), British Member of Parliament for Liverpool
Thomas Salusbury (MP for Flint Boroughs) (by 1518–1561 or later), MP for Flint Boroughs (UK Parliament constituency)